Belén de Bajirá is a Colombian Corregimiento involved in law suit caused by a territorial dispute between two northwestern Colombian departments, Antioquia and Chocó. Chocó argues that the territory belongs to its municipality Riosucio, but Antioquia claimed Belén de Bajirá as part of one of Mutatá. In 2000 the authorities of Chocó founded and approved the municipality in the limits with Antioquia, north-east of Chocó and south of the Antioquean Urabá. However, the Antioquean authorities in Medellín stated that the new municipality was on Antioquean territory and demanded the case before the Council of State of Colombia in Bogotá. By its part, Chocó defended its decision stating that the municipality was legally on the chocoan side.

The Geographic Institute Agustin Codazzi (IGAC, Spanish acronym), which is the entity responsible of the basic cartography and laying out the country maps, issued a final concept requested by the government stating that the limits between the two departments are well defined and there is no doubt that Belén de Bajirá belongs to Chocó. The document issued by IGAC ratifies the geographical limits established in the Law 13 of 1947 which defined Chocó as a department. Therefore, the new country maps will be published setting Belen de Bajirá as part of Chocó.

The place is rich in gold, nickel, oil, copper, petrol and oil palm, but its population is evidently poor.

Climate
Belén de Bajirá has a tropical rainforest climate (Af) with heavy to very heavy rainfall year round.

References

Populated places in the Chocó Department
Corregimientos of Colombia
Internal territorial disputes